The Kursk Root Icon of the Sign (also Our Lady of Kursk) (Bogomater Kurskaya Korennaya, literally Theotokos of Kursk, Found Among the Roots) is an icon of Theotokos of the Sign, apparently painted in the thirteenth century and discovered in a forest near Kursk ca. 1295.

History 
The icon was preserved in the Black Hermitage of the Roots (Chornaya Korennaya Pustyn), an abbey founded on the spot of its discovery. It was regularly brought from the abbey to Kursk in a great procession involving thousands of peasants and pilgrims. This ceremony is depicted in the famous painting by Ilya Repin; see Religious Procession in Kursk Province.

The icon actually incorporates as many as twelve figures on it: Theotokos, Infant Christ, the Lord Sabaoth above them (with the Holy Spirit as a dove) and nine Old Testament prophets. The image of Theotokos belongs to the Panagia type. It was regarded as a palladion of the Russian Imperial Army.

In the autumn of 1920, the icon was taken by the Gen Pyotr Wrangel′s White Army outside Russia; it was kept in Serbia until September 1944 (mostly in the Russian church in Belgrade), then in Vienna and Munich, finally, since January 1951 — in the United States (since 1959, in the cathedral named after the icon, in the new headquarters of the Russian Orthodox Church Outside Russia in 93rd Street New York City).

Since 2009, the icon is regularly brought to Kursk Oblast, Russia, and other places in Russia for veneration by the faithful.

References

External links
https://www.blagovest2000.ru/blog/svitki-prorokov-na-ikone-kurskaya-korennaya   Курско-Коренная икона Божией Матери  This site describes the prophets depicted in the borders of the Kursk Root icon and the texts on the scrolls they hold. 
On the left side, starting from the top: 1.     Holy Prophet and King David. Scroll text: “Arise, O Lord, unto Thy rest” (Psalm 131/132)  2.     Holy Prophet Moses. Scroll text: “I beheld a bush unconsumed” [Exodus 3]  3.     Holy Prophet Isaiah. Scroll text: “Behold, a virgin shall conceive” [Isaiah 7]  4.     Holy Prophet Gideon. Scroll text: “I beheld thee as a fleece” [Judges 6]   Right side, starting from the top:  5.     Holy Prophet and King Solomon. Scroll text: “Wisdom hath built herself a house” [Proverbs 9]  6.     Holy Prophet Daniel. Scroll text: “I beheld a mountain from which was cut a stone” [Daniel 2, referring to the interpretation of Nebuchadnezzar’s dream]  7.     Holy Prophet Jeremiah. Scroll text: “Lo, the days cometh, saith the Lord” [Jeremiah 23:5]  8.     Holy Prophet Elijah. Scroll text: “I have been zealous for the Lord God Almighty” [1 Kings 19]   Bottom:  9. Holy Prophet Habbakuk (Abbacum). Scroll text: “God shall come forth from Thaeman [the south], and the Holy One from the mountain” [Habbakuk 3]
 History with photo of Icon in its riza (metal cover)

Kursk
Shrines to the Virgin Mary
Kursk
Russian icons
Paintings of the Madonna and Child